In Greek and Roman mythology, Glaucus (Ancient Greek: Γλαῦκος Glaukos means "greyish blue" or "bluish green" and "glimmering"), usually surnamed as Potnieus, was a son of Sisyphus whose main myth involved his violent death as the result of his horsemanship. He was the king of the Boeotian city of Potniae or sometimes of Corinth. Glaucus was the subject of a lost tragedy by Aeschylus, Glaucus Potnieus (Glaucus at Potniae), fragments of which are contained in an Oxyrhynchus Papyrus.

Family
The mother of Glaucus was Merope, a daughter of Atlas and one of the Pleiades. By marrying Sisyphus, she became the only one of the Pleiades to mate with a mortal. Glaucus was the brother of Almus, Thersander and Ornytion (Porphyrion)

At first, Sisyphus had tried to arrange a marriage for Glaucus with the shape-shifting Mestra, a daughter of Erysichthon, but despite the payment of valuable bride-gifts, she eluded the marriage and was taken to an island by Poseidon. Glaucus then married a daughter of Nisus named Eurymede or Eurynome. Zeus had declared that Glaucus would sire no children even by his own wife, perhaps because of his violations against Aphrodite. While Eurynome gave birth to the famed hero Bellerophon, Poseidon is usually seen as the true father. The Iliad, however, names Glaucus as Bellerophon's father. The equine theme continues: Poseidon was associated with horses, and Bellerophon was the rider of the winged horse Pegasus. By his wife, Glaucus became the father of Alcimenes (Deliades or Piren) who was unintentionally murdered by his own hero brother.

Glaucus was the ancestor of the Glaucus in the Iliad, through his son Bellerophon who ventured to Lycia.

Mythology
Glaucus took part in the funeral games organized in honor of Pelias by his son Acastus, the famous Athla epi Pelia in which some of the foremost heroes of Greece competed, including the Argonauts. Glaucus lost to Iolaus in the chariot race.  A fragment from Aeschylus's tragedy has sometimes been taken to mean that Glaucus died in a chariot accident on the way home, but it seems more probable that the accident occurred during the race. According to Pausanias, Glaucus haunted the Isthmian Games as a form of Taraxippus, because he was killed by his horses during the funeral games.

There are two main traditions concerning the death of Glaucus. In one, he feeds his mares on human flesh in order to make them fierce in battle, but at the games he has no supply for them, and they turn on their master and devour him instead. Servius, however, regards Glaucus as a doublet of Hippolytus: he offended the goddess Aphrodite (Venus) either by keeping his mares from mating in order to preserve their speed, or by scorning her in general. The goddess then brings retribution upon him through his horses. In other sources, the mares are driven into their man-killing frenzy by consuming either an herb in their Boeotian pasture at Potniae or water from a toxic well. Gilbert Murray saw Hippolytus, Glaucus and their ilk as undergoing sparagmos as vegetation deities.

In the Georgics, Vergil casts the neglect of Venus as preventing the mares from mating. That the Romans considered mating a hazard of horse husbandry is indicated by a strange anecdote from Vergil's older contemporary Varro: when a stallion kept refusing to mate, the handler succeeded by covering its head; when uncovered, the stallion attacked him and killed him by biting.

Notes

References 

 Gaius Julius Hyginus, Fabulae from The Myths of Hyginus translated and edited by Mary Grant. University of Kansas Publications in Humanistic Studies. Online version at the Topos Text Project.
 Hesiod, Catalogue of Women from Homeric Hymns, Epic Cycle, Homerica translated by Evelyn-White, H G. Loeb Classical Library Volume 57. London: William Heinemann, 1914. Online version at theio.com
 Homer, The Iliad with an English Translation by A.T. Murray, Ph.D. in two volumes. Cambridge, MA., Harvard University Press; London, William Heinemann, Ltd. 1924. Online version at the Perseus Digital Library.
 Homer, Homeri Opera in five volumes. Oxford, Oxford University Press. 1920. Greek text available at the Perseus Digital Library.
 Maurus Servius Honoratus, In Vergilii carmina comentarii. Servii Grammatici qui feruntur in Vergilii carmina commentarii; recensuerunt Georgius Thilo et Hermannus Hagen. Georgius Thilo. Leipzig. B. G. Teubner. 1881. Online version at the Perseus Digital Library.
 Pausanias, Description of Greece with an English Translation by W.H.S. Jones, Litt.D., and H.A. Ormerod, M.A., in 4 Volumes. Cambridge, MA, Harvard University Press; London, William Heinemann Ltd. 1918. . Online version at the Perseus Digital Library
Pausanias, Graeciae Descriptio. 3 vols. Leipzig, Teubner. 1903.  Greek text available at the Perseus Digital Library.
 Pindar, Odes translated by Diane Arnson Svarlien. 1990. Online version at the Perseus Digital Library.
 Pindar, The Odes of Pindar including the Principal Fragments with an Introduction and an English Translation by Sir John Sandys, Litt.D., FBA. Cambridge, MA., Harvard University Press; London, William Heinemann Ltd. 1937. Greek text available at the Perseus Digital Library.
 Pliny the Elder, The Natural History. John Bostock, M.D., F.R.S. H.T. Riley, Esq., B.A. London. Taylor and Francis, Red Lion Court, Fleet Street. 1855. Online version at the Perseus Digital Library.
 Pliny the Elder, Naturalis Historia. Karl Friedrich Theodor Mayhoff. Lipsiae. Teubner. 1906. Latin text available at the Perseus Digital Library.
 Pseudo-Apollodorus, The Library with an English Translation by Sir James George Frazer, F.B.A., F.R.S. in 2 Volumes, Cambridge, MA, Harvard University Press; London, William Heinemann Ltd. 1921. . Online version at the Perseus Digital Library. Greek text available from the same website.
 Publius Vergilius Maro, Aeneid. Theodore C. Williams. trans. Boston. Houghton Mifflin Co. 1910. Online version at the Perseus Digital Library.
 Publius Vergilius Maro, Bucolics, Aeneid, and Georgics. J. B. Greenough. Boston. Ginn & Co. 1900. Latin text available at the Perseus Digital Library.
 Publius Vergilius Maro, Bucolics, Aeneid, and Georgics of Vergil. J. B. Greenough. Boston. Ginn & Co. 1900. Online version at the Perseus Digital Library.

Kings in Greek mythology
Corinthian characters in Greek mythology
Boeotian mythology
Corinthian mythology
Deeds of Aphrodite